Epotele Bazamba (born 13 May 1976) is a Congolese former footballer who played as a midfielder. He played in 18 matches for the DR Congo national team from 1997 to 2001. He was also named in the DR Congo's squad for the 1998 African Cup of Nations tournament.

References

External links
 

1976 births
Living people
Democratic Republic of the Congo footballers
Association football midfielders
Democratic Republic of the Congo international footballers
1998 African Cup of Nations players
Place of birth missing (living people)
21st-century Democratic Republic of the Congo people